Rakhmetov is a fictional character from the 1863 novel What Is to Be Done? by Nikolai Chernyshevsky. Although he is only a minor character (appearing in just 1/10 of the book at the end of chapter three), he is the most famous because he inspired so many Russian revolutionaries. His only action in the story is to give the heroine, Vera Pavlovna, a note from her husband explaining that he has faked his suicide. He also offers his criticisms to Vera Pavlovna for her abandoning of her sewing cooperative.

Rakhmetov is descended from Rakhmet, a thirteenth-century Tatar chief. He is the second youngest of eight children. He inherits 400 serfs and 7,000 acres of land. He is 22 when the novel takes place. His father is deeply conservative and clever. At 15, he falls in love with his father's mistress.

He studies at St. Petersburg University from 16–19, then gives up his studies to travel, estranging himself from his siblings and in-laws. At 17 he builds up his physical strength through gymnastics, then by barge hauling at 20 from which he gets the nickname Nikitouchka Lomoff, a legendarily strong boat hauler on the Volga. His other nickname is 'the rigorist'. He performs all kinds of manual labor on his travels: digging, sawing and iron forging. He explains: "I must do it, it will make me loved and esteemed by the common people. And it is useful ; some day it may prove good for some-thing."

He befriends five or six students and studies obsessively, reading continuously for 82 hours, fueled by eight strong coffees before sleeping for 15 hours. He adopts a strict, puritanical way of life. He is celibate, teetotal, sleeps on planks and usually eats black bread and steak. The only luxury he allows himself are fine cigars "Without my cigar I cannot think; if that is a fact, it is not my fault; but perhaps it is due to the weakness of my will." In St. Petersburg, he permits himself oranges because there ordinary people eat them, but in the countryside he doesn't touch them. After six months continuous reading (mainly Nikolai Gogol, Adam Smith, David Ricardo and John Stuart Mill), he decides he has acquired enough knowledge. He never visits people longer than necessary and only visits people with influence over others. He only visits his home to sleep at two or three in the morning.

His ultimate act of self punishment is sleeping on a bed of nails, which may have been based on certain Orthodox Saints. He explains this as a "A trial. It was necessary to make it. Improbable, certainly, but at all events it was necessary to make it. I know now what I can do." Two months later he loses a lump of flesh saving a 19-year-old widow from a stampeding horse. She nurses him, falls in love with him but he rejects her explaining his devotion to the people precludes love.

He tours Europe and the USA. He is rumoured to have met the founder of a new German school of philosophy, possibly Karl Marx. He has decidedly modern views on suicide, only understanding it if it is to escape a painful illness.

Impact 
Rakhmetov was variously regarded as a saint, holy fool or just an eccentric. He inspired the founders of Russian Nihilism and Bolshevism. Vladimir Lenin imitated Rakhmetov with daily weight lifting, while Sergei Nechayev copied him by sleeping on a wooden bed and living on black bread. Nikolai Ishutin copied the character's boat hauling feats.

Anarchist Alexander Berkman used Rakhmetov as a pseudonym when he prepared to assassinate Henry Clay Frick in 1892.

His character was praised by the Soviet government as an example of how the new Soviet man should act.

The main character of André Gide's Les caves du Vatican (English: Lafcadio's Adventures), Lafcadio, bears a striking resemblance to Rakhmetov. Pavel Aleksandrovich Bakhmetev, a noble acquaintance of Chernyshevsky who sold his serfs in 1857, may have inspired the character.

References 

Fictional Russian people in literature
Fictional revolutionaries
Literary characters introduced in 1863
Characters in novels of the 19th century